Almas is a town in Mé-Zóchi District, São Tomé Island, São Tomé and Príncipe. Its population is 1,255 (2012 census). It lies 1 km southwest of Praia Melão and 5 km south of the capital São Tomé.

Population history

References

Populated places in Mé-Zóchi District